Jason S. Grenn (born 1981)  is an American politician from Alaska. Grenn served as an independent member of the Alaska House of Representatives from the 22nd district, which covers the Sand Lake-area neighborhoods in Anchorage, Alaska. He beat incumbent Liz Vazquez in the 2016 general election and was defeated by Sara Rasmussen in 2018.

Political career
In Grenn's 2016 campaign, he has said his main objective was to help solve an Alaskan fiscal crisis; a bill said to do that failed to pass in the 2015-16 legislature. While in office, Grenn was able to pass a major legislative ethics bill (HB44) and championed economic development innovations for Alaska. He also received the 2018 "Friend of Education" award from the Anchorage Education Association and received a "Legislative Recognition" award from the Alaska Tourism Industry Association. Grenn identifies as a social liberal and fiscal conservative. After his loss to Republican Sara Rasmussen, Grenn stayed in politics as the Executive Director of Alaskans for Better Elections, a group supporting the reforms of 2020 Alaska Measure 2. Measure 2 narrowly passed in November 2020 and Alaskans for Better Elections converted into a voter education group to ensure that the reforms of Measure 2 were implemented well.

Electoral history

2016

2018

Personal life
Grenn is married and has three children. A lifelong resident of Anchorage, he graduated from Dimond High School in 1999 and from Northwest Nazarene University in 2003.

References

External links

1981 births
Living people
Alaska Independents
Alaska Republicans
Members of the Alaska House of Representatives
Northwest Nazarene University alumni
Politicians from Anchorage, Alaska